Zyba is an unincorporated community in Sumner County, Kansas, United States.  It is located about 4 miles southwest of the Kansas Star Casino at N West St and E 120th Ave N, next to the railroad and Ninnescah River.

History
A post office was opened in Zyba in 1887, and remained in operation until it was discontinued in 1906.

Education
The community is served by Belle Plaine USD 357 public school district.

References

Further reading

External links
 Sumner County map, KDOT

Unincorporated communities in Sumner County, Kansas
Unincorporated communities in Kansas